Derbyshire County Cricket Club in 1903 was the cricket season when the English club Derbyshire had been playing for thirty two years. It was their ninth season in the County Championship and they won five matches to come twelfth

1903 season

Derbyshire  played sixteen games in the County Championship  in addition to two matches against W.G. Grace's London County Cricket Club and one against MCC. They won four matches in the Championship and one against London County.

The captain for the year was Albert Lawton in his second season as captain. Levi Wright was top scorer and Billy Bestwick  took most wickets.

A significant addition to the Derbyshire side was Arthur Morton who played for the club until 1926. Other new players in the season were R T Ryder who played his one career first class match against London County  and G Green who also made one appearance against London County but played for Derbyshire intermittently over several seasons.

Matches

{| class="wikitable" width="100%"
! bgcolor="#efefef" colspan=6 | List of  matches
|- bgcolor="#efefef"
!No.
!Date
!V
!Result 
!Margin
!Notes
|- 
|1
|11 May 1903
| Nottinghamshire   Trent Bridge, Nottingham 
|bgcolor="#FF0000"|Lost
| 6 wickets
| Wass 5-43 
|- 
|2
|18 May 1903
| Lancashire   County Ground, Derby  
|bgcolor="#FF0000"|Lost
| 10 wickets
| Barnes 7-25 and 7-34; JJ Hulme 8-52 
|- 
|3
| 21 May 1903 
| MCC Lord's Cricket Ground, St John's Wood 
|bgcolor="#FF0000"|Lost
| 9 wickets
| Llewellyn 5-65; JJ Hulme 6-60; Thompson 5-30 
|- 
|4
|01 Jun 1903
| HampshireCounty Ground, Southampton 
|bgcolor="#FF0000"|Lost
| 261 runs
| Llewellyn 148; Hill 150; JJ Hulme 7-123; Chignell 5-68; Hesketh-Pritchard 7-47 
|- 
|5
|08 Jun 1903
| Essex  County Ground, Leyton 
|bgcolor="#FFCC00"|Drawn
|
| Perrin 102(rh); Buckenham 6-47; W Bestwick 5-95; Mead 5-77 
|- 
|6
|15 Jun 1903
| Surrey  Queen's Park, Chesterfield  
|bgcolor="#00FF00"|Won
| 111 runs
| W Bestwick 7-20; Richardson 5-43 
|- 
|7
| 18 Jun 1903
| Yorkshire  County Ground, Derby 
|bgcolor="#FF0000"|Lost
| 7 wickets
| JJ Hulme 5-69 
|- 
|8
|22 Jun 1903
| Warwickshire   Edgbaston, Birmingham 
|bgcolor="#FFCC00"|Drawn
|
| LG Wright  133; Field 6-82 and 5-150 
|- 
|9
| 25 Jun 1903
| Leicestershire   County Ground, Derby  
|bgcolor="#00FF00"|Won
| 35 runs
| Gill 5-93; A Warren  5-69 and 6-112 
|- 
|10
|06 Jul 1903
| Leicestershire  Aylestone Road, Leicester  
|bgcolor="#FF0000"|Lost
| 126 runs
| King 167; Odell 6-74 
|- 
|11
|09 Jul 1903
| Nottinghamshire   County Ground, Derby 
|bgcolor="#00FF00"|Won
| 114 runs
| SWA Cadman 5-42; A Warren  6-93 
|- 
|12
|16 Jul 1903 
| London County Cricket Club   Crystal Palace Park 
|bgcolor="#FF0000"|Lost
| Innings and 31 runs
| W Smith 123; Cranfield 7-105 
|- 
|13
|20 Jul 1903
| Essex   North Road Ground, Glossop 
|bgcolor="#FF0000"|Lost
| 232 runs
| Mead 5-38 
|- 
|14
|03 Aug 1903
| HampshireCounty Ground, Derby  
|bgcolor="#00FF00"|Won
| Innings and 59 runs
| E Needham 131; A Warren  6-43 
|- 
|15
|06 Aug 1903
| Lancashire   Old Trafford, Manchester 
|bgcolor="#FF0000"|Lost
| 9 wickets
| LG Wright  116; Hallows 5-42 
|- 
|16
|10 Aug 1903
| SurreyKennington Oval 
|bgcolor="#FFCC00"|Drawn
|
| Dowson 100* 
|- 
|17
|13 Aug 1903
| Yorkshire   St George's Road, Harrogate 
|bgcolor="#FFCC00"|Drawn
|
|  
|- 
|18
|17 Aug 1903
| Warwickshire  Queen's Park, Chesterfield 
|bgcolor="#FFCC00"|Drawn
|
| W Bestwick 5-86; Hargreave 5-55; Santall 5-19 
|- 
|19
| 20 Aug 1903 
| London County Cricket Club  County Ground, Derby 
|bgcolor="#00FF00"|Won
| 8 wickets
| Odell 7-69 
|-

Statistics

County Championship batting averages

In addition, W Locker played against MCC, CE Middleton and G Curgenven played in the first match against London County, and R T Ryder and G Green played in the second match against London County.

County Championship  bowling averages

County Championship Wicket keeping
Joe Humphries Catches 23, Stumping 9

See also
Derbyshire County Cricket Club seasons
1903 English cricket season

References

1903 in English cricket
Derbyshire County Cricket Club seasons
English cricket seasons in the 20th century